The Samsung Galaxy Grand Prime was an entry level Android smartphone manufactured and marketed by Samsung Electronics. The Grand Prime line served as a successor to the Core Prime launch in 2015.

It was originally introduced in 2014 as an exclusive for the INDIAN & Pakistani market, but was later released as a budget phone the following year for a number of markets in Asia. It was also made available in the United States through mobile providers such as MetroPCS, Cricket, Verizon, T-Mobile, and Sprint, in addition to Canadian providers, such as Freedom Mobile, Chatr Mobile, Koodo, SpeakOut and Public M. 

In 2016, Samsung announced that it released the successor to the Grand Prime. It was launched as the Samsung Galaxy Grand Prime Plus, known as the J2 Prime in some territories.

Hardware

Parts 
The Samsung Galaxy Grand Prime included:

 ARMv8 1.2 GHz Quad-Core CPU
 8 GB Storage
 1 GB RAM
 2600 mAh Li-ion Battery
 MicroSD slot
 Adreno 306 Vivante GC7000UL (Value Edition)
 SIM Card slot
 8 MegaPixel with LED Flash (Rear Camera)

 5 MegaPixel (Front Camera)

Features 
The Samsung Galaxy Grand Prime was a smartphone powered by Android (preinstalled with version 5) The screen has a touch-screen display of 5.00 inch 540x960.  The headphone slot has a 3.5mm headphone jack, micro-USB port for charging and data transfer.

References

Android (operating system) devices
Samsung mobile phones
Samsung Galaxy
Mobile phones introduced in 2014